Grainne Gallanagh (born 22 June 1994) is an Irish model and beauty pageant titleholder who was crowned Miss Universe Ireland 2018 on 2 August 2018. She represented Ireland at Miss Universe 2018, and placed in the Top 20.

Early life 
Gallanagh was raised in Buncrana, Donegal. She attended Scoil Mhuire, Buncrana. She is a Bachelor of Science graduate from Letterkenny Institute of Technology and a nurse by profession specializing in Women's Health.

Pageantry

Miss Earth Northern Ireland 2017
Gallanagh was crowned as Miss Earth Northern Ireland-Air in 2017.

Miss Universe Ireland 2018
On 2 August 2018, Gallanagh was crowned as Miss Universe Ireland 2018 at Dublin’s Mansion House. She succeeded outgoing Miss Universe Ireland 2017 and Miss Universe 2017 Top 16 semifinalist Cailín Toibín.

Miss Universe 2018
She represented Ireland at the Miss Universe 2018 finals and placed Top 20.

Media career

Gallanagh appeared on the fourth season of the Irish edition of Dancing with the Stars in 2020. She reached the final with her professional partner, finishing as runners-up. Gallanagh appears regularly as a guest host on Virgin Media One's The Six O'Clock Show. In 2021, Gallanagh appeared on a charity special of Ireland's Fittest Family. Her team reached the final race and eventually finished as runners-up.

References

External links

1994 births
Irish beauty pageant winners
Irish female models
Living people
Miss Universe 2018 contestants
People from Buncrana
People from County Donegal
Alumni of Letterkenny Institute of Technology
Beauty pageant contestants from Ireland